Duane Capizzi is an American writer and television producer.  He is known for his extensive work in animated series for television, including the Emmy Award-winning  Transformers: Prime for which he was Co-Executive Producer and Head Writer, and co-developed its follow-up Transformers: Robots in Disguise. For Warner Bros. Animation, he was writer/producer of the animated series The Batman as well as its spin-off feature, The Batman vs. Dracula.  He wrote the first DC Universe animated feature, Superman: Doomsday (based on The Death of Superman saga, and directed by Bruce Timm). Other animated series producing/writing credits include Jackie Chan Adventures, Big Guy and Rusty the Boy Robot, Men in Black: The Series, and series development on the CG animated Roughnecks: The Starship Troopers Chronicles for Sony Pictures Television. He wrote and story edited for two animated spin-offs of Jim Carrey films: Ace Ventura: Pet Detective and The Mask. He also wrote and story edited for several Disney Afternoon TV series including Darkwing Duck, Aladdin, TaleSpin, and Bonkers.  He began his career in animation writing scripts for Robotech II: The Sentinels for Harmony Gold. The series was never produced, but led to writing and story editing on ALF: The Animated Series.

From 2019-2021, Capizzi served as showrunner for the animated TV series adaptation of Carmen Sandiego.

Screenwriting credits
 series head writer denoted in bold

Television
 ALF: The Animated Series (1987-1989)
 COPS (1988)
 The Real Ghostbusters (1988)
 Teenage Mutant Ninja Turtles (1989)
 Alvin and the Chipmunks (1989)
 Disney's Adventures of the Gummi Bears (1990-1991)
Talespin (1992)
Darkwing Duck (1992)
 Bonkers (1993)
 Aladdin (1994)
 The Savage Dragon (1995)
 Ace Ventura: Pet Detective (1995-1997)
 The Mask: Animated Series (1995-1997)
 Extreme Ghostbusters (1997)
 Men in Black: The Series (1997-1999)
 Roughnecks: The Starship Troopers Chronicles (1999-2000)
 Big Guy and Rusty the Boy Robot (1999-2001)
 Jackie Chan Adventures (2000-2003)
 The Batman (2004-2006)
 Transformers: Prime (2010-2013)
 Hardboiled Eggheads (2014)
 Transformers: Robots In Disguise (2015)
 Be Cool, Scooby-Doo! (2015, 2017)
 Skylanders Academy (2016)
 Justice League Action (2017)
 Carmen Sandiego (2019-2021)

Films
 The Return of Jafar (1994)
 The Batman vs. Dracula (2005)
 Superman: Brainiac Attacks (2006)
 Superman: Doomsday (2007)
 Transformers Prime Beast Hunters: Predacons Rising (2013)
 Lego Scooby-Doo! Haunted Hollywood (2016)
 Carmen Sandiego: To Steal or Not to Steal (2020)

Producer

Television 
 Bonkers (1993)
 The Savage Dragon (1995)
 The Mask: Animated Series (1995-1997)
 Extreme Ghostbusters (1997)
 Men in Black: The Series (1998-2001)
 Big Guy and Rusty the Boy Robot (1999-2001)
 Jackie Chan Adventures (2000-2002)
 The Batman (2004-2008)
 Transformers: Prime (2010-2013)
 Hardboiled Eggheads (2014)
 Carmen Sandiego (2019-2021)

Features
 The Batman vs. Dracula (2005)
 Superman: Brainiac Attacks (2006)

References

External links

 

Living people
Place of birth missing (living people)
Year of birth missing (living people)
American screenwriters